Chris Brown is an American singer and actor. In 2006, Chris Brown received twenty-three nominations and won nine, including Viewer's Choice for "Yo (Excuse Me Miss)" at the BET Awards; Male Artist of the Year, New Artist of the Year and Artist of the Year at the Billboard Music Awards; Outstanding New Artist at the NAACP Image Awards, Choice Breakout Male at the Teen Choice Awards; Best R&B/Soul New Artist at the Soul Train Music Awards; Fake ID Award at the TRL Awards; Best R&B Video for "Run It!" at the MTV Australia Awards.

In 2007, he received twelve nominations but did not win any awards. In 2008, Brown has received forty-one nominations and won sixteen, including Favorite Male Pop/Rock Artist, Favorite Soul/R&B Male Artist and Artist of the Year at the American Music Awards; Best Male R&B Artist at the BET Awards; Best Heartbreak Video for "No Air" at the BET Pre-Awards; Best International Act and Best R&B/Soul at the MOBO Awards; Best Male Video for "With You" at the MTV Video Music Awards; Best Male Artist at the NAACP Image Awards; Favorite Male Singer at the Nickelodeon Kids' Choice Awards; Best R&B Artist at the Ozone Awards; Choice Music Hookup for "No Air", Choice Music: Male Artist, Choice Music: R&B Artist, Choice Music: R&B Track for "Forever" and Choice Music: Rap/Hip Hop Track for "Shawty Get Loose" at the Teen Choice Awards. In 2010, he won the AOL Fandemonium Award at the BET Awards.

American Music Awards
The American Music Awards is an annual awards ceremony created by Dick Clark in 1973. Brown has won five awards from twenty-oneth nominations.

|-
|2006
|rowspan="4"|Chris Brown
|Favorite Soul/R&B Male Artist
|
|-
|rowspan="3"|2008
|Favorite Pop/Rock Male Artist
|
|-
|Favorite Soul/R&B Male Artist
|
|-
|Artist of the Year
|
|-
|2010
|Chris Brown
|Favorite Soul/R&B Male Artist
|
|-
|rowspan="2"|2011
|Chris Brown
|Favorite Soul/R&B Male Artist
|
|-
|F.A.M.E.
|Favorite Soul/R&B Album
|
|-
|rowspan="2"|2012
|Chris Brown
|Favorite Soul/R&B Male Artist
|
|-
|Fortune
|Favorite Soul/R&B Album
|
|-
|rowspan="1"|2014
|rowspan="2"|Chris Brown
|Favorite Soul/R&B Male Artist
|
|-
|rowspan="2"|2015
|Favorite Soul/R&B Male Artist
|
|-
|X
|Favorite Soul/R&B Album
|
|-
|2016
|Chris Brown
|Favorite Soul/R&B Male Artist
|
|-
|rowspan="2"|2019
|Chris Brown
|Favorite Soul/R&B Male Artist
|
|-
|Indigo
|Favorite Soul/R&B Album
|
|-
|rowspan="2"|2020
|Chris Brown
|Favorite Soul/R&B Male Artist
|
|-
|"No Guidance" (with Drake)
|Favorite Soul/R&B Song
|
|-
|rowspan="3"|2021
|Chris Brown
|Favorite Soul/R&B Male Artist
|
|-
|rowspan="2"|"Go Crazy" (with Young Thug)
|Favorite Soul/R&B Song
|
|-
|Collaboration of the Year
|
|-
|2022
|Chris Brown
|Favorite Soul/R&B Male Artist
|
|-
|}

ARIA Music Awards
The ARIA Music Awards is an annual awards show from the Australian Recording Industry Association. Brown received one nomination.

|-
|2011
|Chris Brown
|Most Popular International Artist
|
|}

BET Awards

BET Awards
The BET Awards were established in 2001 by the Black Entertainment Television (BET) network to celebrate African Americans and other minorities in music, acting, sports, and other fields of entertainment. The awards are presented annually and broadcast live on BET. Brown has won 18 awards from 52 nominations.

|-
|rowspan="3"|2006
|rowspan="2"|Chris Brown
|Best New Artist
|
|-
|Best Male R&B Artist
|
|-
|"Yo (Excuse Me Miss)"
|Viewer's Choice
|
|-
|rowspan="1"|2007
|"Shortie Like Mine"  (with Bow Wow & Johntá Austin)
|Viewer's Choice
|
|-
|rowspan="4"|2008
|Chris Brown
|Best Male R&B Artist
|
|-
|rowspan="2"|"Kiss Kiss"  (with T-Pain)
|Best Collaboration
|
|-
|Viewer's Choice
|
|-
|"No Air"  (with Jordin Sparks)
|Viewer's Choice
|
|-
|rowspan="2"|2010
|rowspan="2"|Chris Brown
|Best Male R&B Artist
|
|-
|AOL Fandemonium Award
|
|-
|rowspan="7"|2011
|Chris Brown
|Best Male R&B Artist
|
|-
|rowspan="3"|"Look at Me Now"  (with Busta Rhymes & Lil Wayne)
|Best Collaboration
|
|-
|Video of the Year
|
|-
|Coca-Cola Viewer's Choice
|
|-
|"Deuces"  (with Tyga & Kevin McCall)
|Best Collaboration
|
|-
|rowspan="2"|Chris Brown
|Best Actor
|
|-
|FANdemonium Award
|
|-
|rowspan="4"|2012
|rowspan="3"|Chris Brown
|Best Male R&B Artist
|
|-
|Video Director of the Year
|
|-
|FANdemonium Award
|
|-
|"Turn Up the Music"
|Coca-Cola Viewer's Choice
|
|-
|rowspan="2"|2013
|rowspan="2"|Chris Brown
|Best Male R&B Artist
|
|-
|FANdemonium Award
|
|-
|rowspan="3"|2014
|rowspan="2"|Chris Brown
|Best Male R&B Artist
|
|-
|Video Director of the Year
|
|-
|"Fine China"
|Video of the Year
|
|-
|rowspan="7"|2015
|rowspan="2"|"Loyal" (with Lil Wayne & Tyga)
|Best Collaboration
|
|-
|Video of the Year
|
|-
|rowspan="2"|"New Flame" (with Usher & Rick Ross)
|Best Collaboration
|
|-
|Video of the Year
|
|-
|rowspan="2"|Chris Brown
|Best Male R&B/Pop Artist
|
|-
|FANdemoniam Award
|
|-
|"Only" (with Nicki Minaj, Drake & Lil Wayne)
|Coca-Cola Viewer's Choice Award
|
|-
|rowspan="4"|2016
|rowspan="2"|Chris Brown
|Best Male R&B/Pop Artist
|
|-
|Video Director of the Year
|
|-
|"Play No Games"  (with Big Sean & Ty Dolla $ign)
|Best Collaboration
|
|-
|"Back to Sleep"
|Coca-Cola Viewer's Choice Award
|
|-
|rowspan="2"|2017
|Chris Brown
|Best Male R&B/Pop Artist
|
|-
|"Party"  (with Usher & Gucci Mane)
| Best Collaboration
|
|-
|rowspan="3"|2018
|Chris Brown
|Best Male R&B/Pop Artist
|
|-
|Chris Brown
| Video Director of the Year
|
|-
|"Melanin Magic"  (with Remy Ma)
|BET Her Award
|
|-		
|2019
|Chris Brown	
|Best Male R&B/Pop Artist
|
|-
|rowspan="4"|2020
|Chris Brown
|Best Male R&B/Pop Artist
|
|-
|rowspan="3"|"No Guidance" (with Drake)
| Video of the Year	
|
|-
|Best Collaboration
|
|-
|Coca-Cola Viewer's Choice Award		
|
|-
|rowspan="4"|2021
|Chris Brown
|Best Male R&B/Pop Artist
|
|-
|Chris Brown & Young Thug
|Best Group
|
|-
|rowspan="2"|"Go Crazy" (with Young Thug)
| Video of the Year	
|
|-
|Coca-Cola Viewer's Choice Award		
|
|-	
|2022
|Chris Brown	
|Best Male R&B/Pop Artist
|
|-
|}

BET Pre-Awards
The BET Pre-Awards were established in 2001 by the Black Entertainment Television network to celebrate African Americans and other minorities in music, acting, sports, and other fields of entertainment. These annually presented awards are presented before the BET Awards and broadcast live on BET. Brown has won one award.

|-
|2008
|"No Air"  (with Jordin Sparks)
|Best Heartbreak Video
|
|-
|}

BET Hip Hop Awards
The BET Hip Hop Awards are hosted annually by BET for hip hop performers, producers, and music video directors. Brown has been nominated ten times and won four awards.

|-
|rowspan="2"|2008
|rowspan="2"|"Get Like Me"  (with David Banner & Yung Joc)
|Best Hip Hop Video
|
|-
|Best Hip Hop Collaboration
|
|-
|rowspan="4"|2011
|rowspan="3"|"Look at Me Now"  (with Busta Rhymes & Lil Wayne)
| Verizon People's Champ Award
|
|-
|Reese's Perfect Combo Award
|
|-
|rowspan="3"|Best Hip Hop Video
|
|-
|"My Last" (with Big Sean)
|
|-
|rowspan="1"|2015
|rowspan="1"|"Play No Games"  (with Big Sean & Ty Dolla $ign)
|
|-
|rowspan="1"|2020
|rowspan="2"|Chris Brown & Young Thug
|rowspan="2"|Best Duo or Group
|
|-
|rowspan="2"|2021
|
|-
|"Go Crazy" (with Young Thug)
|Best Hip Hop Video
|
|-
|}

Billboard Awards

Billboard Music Awards
The Billboard Music Awards are sponsored by Billboard magazine and is held annually in December. The awards are based on sales data by Nielsen SoundScan and radio information by Nielsen Broadcast Data Systems. Brown has won four awards.

|-
|rowspan="8"|2006
|rowspan="8"|Chris Brown
|Male Artist of the Year
|
|-
|New Artist of the Year
|
|-
|Artist of the Year
|
|-
|Video Clips Artist of the Year
|
|-
|Male Hot 100 Artist of the Year
|
|-
|New R&B/Hip-Hop Artist of the Year
|
|-
|Male R&B/Hip-Hop Artist of the Year
|
|-
|R&B/Hip-Hop Songs Artist of the Year
|
|-
|rowspan="4"|2012
|rowspan="2"|Chris Brown
|Top Male Artist
|
|-
|Top R&B Artist
|
|-
|"She Ain't You"
|Top R&B Song
|
|-
|F.A.M.E.
|Top R&B Album
|
|-
|rowspan="3"|2013
|Chris Brown
|Top R&B Artist
|
|-
|Fortune
|Top R&B Album
|
|-
|"Algo Me Gusta de Ti"  (with Wisin & Yandel and T-Pain)
|Top Latin Song
|
|-
|rowspan="3"|2015
|Chris Brown
|Top R&B Artist
|
|-
|X
|Top R&B Album
|
|-
|"Loyal"  (with Lil Wayne, French Montana, Too Short & Tyga)
|Top R&B Song
|
|-
|rowspan="3"|2016
|Chris Brown
|Top R&B Artist
|
|-
|Royalty
|Top R&B Album
|
|-
|"Post to Be"  (with Omarion & Jhené Aiko)
|Top R&B Song
|
|-
|2018
|Chris Brown
|Top R&B Artist
|
|-
|2019
|"Freaky Friday" (with Lil Dicky)
|Top R&B Song
|
|-
|rowspan="6"|2020
|rowspan="2"|Chris Brown
|Top R&B Artist
|
|-
|Top R&B Male Artist
|
|-
|Indigo
|Top R&B Album
|
|-
|rowspan="3"|"No Guidance" (with Drake)
|Top R&B Song
|
|-
|Top Collaboration
|
|-
|Top Streaming Song
|
|-
|rowspan="7"|2021
|rowspan="2"|Chris Brown
|Top R&B Artist
|
|-
|Top R&B Male Artist
|
|-
|Slime & B (with Young Thug)
|Top R&B Album
|
|-
|rowspan="4"|"Go Crazy" (with Young Thug)
|Top R&B Song
|
|-
|Top Collaboration
|
|-
|Top Hot 100 Song
|
|-
|Top Radio Song
|
|-
|}

Billboard Latin Music Awards
The Billboard Latin Music Awards are awarded annually by the Billboard magazine in the United States. Brown has received four nominations.

|-
|rowspan="3"|2013
|Chris Brown
|Crossover Artist of the Year
|
|-
|rowspan="2"|"Algo Me Gusta de Ti"  (with Wisin & Yandel and T-Pain)
|Song of the Year, Vocal Event
|
|-
|Latin Pop Song of the Year
|
|-
|2022
|Chris Brown	
|Crossover Artist of the Year
|
|-
|}

Billboard R&B/Hip-Hop Awards
The Billboard R&B/Hip-Hop Awards reflect the performance of recordings on the Hot R&B/Hip-Hop Songs and Hot Rap Tracks. Brown has been nominated three times.

|-
|rowspan="3"|2006
|"Run It!"  (with Juelz Santana)
|Hot R&B/Hip-Hop Songs Sales
|
|-
|rowspan="2"|Chris Brown
|Top R&B/Hip-Hop Songs Artist
|
|-
|Top R&B/Hip-Hop Artist - New	
|
|}

Billboard.com Mid-Year Music Awards

|-
|2011
|Chris Brown at Good Morning America
|Most Memorable Meltdown
|
|-
|rowspan="2"|2012
|Drake vs Chris Brown
|Most Memorable Feud
|
|-
|Chris Brown/Rihanna Remixes
|Most Shocking Moment
|
|-
|2013
|Drake vs Chris Brown
|Most Memorable Feud
|
|}

BMI Awards

BMI Pop Awards

|-
|2007
|"Run It!"  (with Juelz Santana)
|rowspan="9"|Award-Winning Songs
|
|-
|rowspan="4"|2009
|"Forever"
|
|-
|"Kiss Kiss"  (with T-Pain)
|
|-
|"No Air"  (with Jordin Sparks)
|
|-
|"With You"
|
|-
|2010
|"Disturbia"
|
|-
|2012
|"Yeah 3x"
|
|-
|2013
|"International Love" (with Pitbull)
|
|-
|2014
|"Don't Wake Me Up"
|
|-
|}

BMI R&B/Hip-Hop Awards

|-
|2006
|"Run It!"  (with Juelz Santana)
|rowspan="11"|Award-Winning Songs
|
|-
|2007
|"Gimme That (Remix)"  (with Lil Wayne)
|
|-
|2008
|"Kiss Kiss"  (with T-Pain)
|
|-
|rowspan="4"|2009
|"Get Like Me"  (with David Banner & Yung Joc)
|
|-
|"No Air"  (with Jordin Sparks)
|
|-
|"Take You Down"
|
|-
|"With You"
|
|-
|2011
|"Deuces"  (with Tyga & Kevin McCall)
|
|-
|rowspan="3"|2012
|"Look at Me Now"  (with Busta Rhymes & Lil Wayne)
|
|-
|"My Last" (with Big Sean)
|
|-
|"She Ain't You"
|
|-
|rowspan="2"|2013
|"Strip"  (with Kevin McCall)
|rowspan="7"|Most Performed R&B/Hip-Hop Songs
|
|-
|"Birthday Cake" (with Rihanna)
|
|-
|rowspan="2"|2014
|"Fine China"
|
|-
|"Love More"  (with Nicki Minaj)
|
|-
|rowspan="3"|2015
|"Main Chick"  (with Kid Ink)
|
|-
|"New Flame"  (with Usher & Rick Ross)
|
|-
|"Show Me"  (with Kid Ink)
|
|-
|rowspan="6"|2016
|Chris Brown
|Songwriter of the Year
|
|-
|"All Eyes On You"  (with Meek Mill & Nicki Minaj)
|rowspan="9"|Most Performed R&B/Hip-Hop Songs
|
|-
|"Ayo"  (with Tyga)
|
|-
|"Fun"  (with Pitbull)
|
|-
|"Hold You Down"  (with DJ Khaled, August Alsina, Future & Jeremih)
|
|-
|"Post to Be"  (with Omarion & Jhené Aiko)
|
|-
|rowspan="2"|2017
|"Back to Sleep"
|
|-
|"Do You Mind"  (with DJ Khaled, Nicki Minaj, August Alsina, Jeremih, Future & Rick Ross)
|
|-
|2020
|"No Guidance" (with Drake)
|
|-
|2021
|"Heat" (with Gunna)
|
|-
|}

BMI London Awards

|-
|rowspan="2"|2009
|rowspan="2"|"With You"
|Award-Winning Songs
|
|-
|Urban Award
|
|-
|2012
|"Look at Me Now"  (with Busta Rhymes & Lil Wayne)
|rowspan="5"|Award-Winning Songs
|
|-
|rowspan="2"|2013
|"Don't Wake Me Up"
|
|-
|"I Can Only Imagine"  (with David Guetta & Lil Wayne)
|
|-
|2017
|"How Many Times"  (with DJ Khaled, Lil Wayne & Big Sean)
|
|-
|2019
|"Freaky Friday" (with Lil Dicky)
|
|-
|}

Bravo Otto
The Bravo Otto award is a German accolade honoring excellence of performers in film, television and music. Presented annually since 1957, winners are selected by the readers of Bravo magazine. The award is presented in gold, silver and bronze.

|-
|2013
|Chris Brown & Justin Bieber
|Super-BFFs
|
|}

Global Awards
The Global Awards are held by Global and reward music played on British radio stations including Capital, Capital XTRA, Heart, Classic FM, Smooth, Radio X, LBC and Gold, with the awards categories reflecting the songs, artists, programmes and news aired on each station.

|-
|2020
|Chris Brown
|Best Hip-Hop or RnB
|
|}

Golden Raspberry Awards
The Golden Raspberry Awards is an award ceremony that honors the worst in film. Brown received one nomination.

|-
|2013
|Battle of the Year
|Worst Supporting Actor
|
|}

Grammy Awards
The Grammy Awards are awarded annually by the National Academy of Recording Arts and Sciences. Brown has been nominated twenty times and thus far won a Grammy for Best R&B Album.

|-
|rowspan="2"|
|Chris Brown
|Best New Artist
|
|-
|Chris Brown
|Best Contemporary R&B Album
|
|-
|
|"Kiss Kiss" (with T-Pain)
|Best Rap/Sung Collaboration
|
|-
|rowspan="2"|
|"No Air" (with Jordin Sparks)
|Best Pop Collaboration with Vocals
|
|-
|"Take You Down"
|Best Male R&B Vocal Performance
|
|-
|rowspan="3"|
|"Take My Time" (with Tank)
|Best R&B Performance by a Duo or Group with Vocals
|
|-
|Graffiti
|Best Contemporary R&B Album
|
|-
|"Deuces" (with Tyga & Kevin McCall)
|Best Rap/Sung Collaboration
|
|-
|rowspan="3"|
|F.A.M.E.
|Best R&B Album
|
|-
|rowspan="2"|"Look at Me Now" (with Lil Wayne & Busta Rhymes)
|Best Rap Performance
|
|-
|Best Rap Song
|
|-
|
|Fortune
|rowspan="2"|Best Urban Contemporary Album
|
|-
|rowspan="3"|2015
|X
|
|-
|rowspan="2"|"New Flame" (with Usher & Rick Ross)
|Best R&B Performance
|
|-
|Best R&B Song
|
|-
|2016
|"Only" (with Nicki Minaj, Drake & Lil Wayne)
|Best Rap/Sung Collaboration
|
|-
|2020
|"No Guidance" (with Drake)
|Best R&B Song
|
|-
| rowspan="2" |2022
|Back of My Mind 
| rowspan="2" |Album of the Year
|
|-
|Donda 
|
|-
|2023
|Breezy
|Best R&B Album
|
|-
|}

iHeartRadio Music Awards
The iHeartRadio Music Awards is a music awards show, founded by iHeartRadio in 2014, to recognize the most popular artists and music over the past year as determined by the network's listeners.

|-
|rowspan="3"|2015
|"Loyal" (with Lil Wayne & Tyga)
|rowspan="2"|Hip Hop/R&B Song of the Year
|
|-
|"New Flame" (with Usher & Rick Ross)
|
|-
|Teem Breezy
|Best Fan Army
|
|-
|rowspan="2"|2016
|Chris Brown
|R&B Artist of the Year
|
|-
|"Post to Be" (with Omarion & Jhené Aiko)
|R&B Song of the Year
|
|-
|rowspan="1"|2019
|"Freaky Friday" (with Lil Dicky)
|Best Music Video
|
|-
|rowspan="2"|2020
|Chris Brown
|R&B Artist of the Year
|
|-
|"No Guidance" (with Drake)
|R&B Song of the Year
|
|-
|rowspan="4"|2021
|Chris Brown
|R&B Artist of the Year
|
|-
|"Go Crazy" (with Young Thug)
|rowspan="2"| R&B Song of the Year
|
|-
|"Heat" (with Gunna)
|
|-
|"Go Crazy" (with Young Thug)
|Best Collaboration
|
|-
|}

iHeartRadio Titanium Awards 
iHeartRadio Titanium Awards are awarded to an artist when their song reaches 1 Billion Spins across iHeartRadio Stations.

International Dance Music Awards
The International Dance Music Awards are an awards show for the dance and electronic music industry. Brown has been nominated six times.

|-
|2007
|"Run It!"  (with Juelz Santana)
|Best R&B/Urban Dance Track
|
|-
|2009
|"Forever"
|Best R&B/Urban Dance Track
|
|-
|rowspan="2"|2012
|"Beautiful People"  (with Benny Benassi)
|Best R&B/Urban Dance Track
|
|-
|"Look at Me Now"  (with Busta Rhymes & Lil Wayne)
|Best Rap/Hip Hop Dance Track
|
|-
|2013
|"International Love"  (with Pitbull)
|Best Latin Dance Track
|
|-
|2015
|"Loyal"  (with Lil Wayne & Tyga)
|Best R&B/Urban Dance Track
|
|}

Kora Awards
The Kora Awards are music awards given annually for musical achievement in sub-Saharan Africa. Brown has won one award.

|-
|2013
|Chris Brown
|Best Male Artist of Diaspora USA
|
|}

Lo Nuestro Awards
The Lo Nuestro Awards are awarded annually by television network Univision in the United States. Brown has received two nominations.

|-
|rowspan="2" | 2014
|rowspan="2" | "Algo Me Gusta de Ti" (with Wisin & Yandel and T-Pain)
| Collaboration of the Year
| 
|-
| Urban Song of the Year
| 
|-
|}

Meteor Music Awards
The Meteor Music Awards are an annual awards show from Irish Recording Music Association. Brown received one nomination.

|-
|2009
|Chris Brown
|Best International Male
|
|}

MOBO Awards
The MOBO Awards (an acronym for "Music of Black Origin") were established in 1996 by Kanya King. They are held annually in the United Kingdom to recognize artists of any race or nationality performing music of black origin. Brown has won two awards from eight nominations.

|-
|rowspan="2"|2006
|Chris Brown
|Best International Male
|
|-
|"Run It!"  (with Juelz Santana)
|Best Video
|
|-
|rowspan="2"|2008
|rowspan="2"|Chris Brown
|Best International Act
|
|-
|Best R&B/Soul
|
|-
|2011
|"Champion" (with Chipmunk)
|Best Video
| 
|-
|2014
|Chris Brown
|Best International Act
| 
|-
|2015
| "Body on Me" (with Rita Ora)
| Best Video
| 
|-
|2022
|Chris Brown
|Best International Act
| 
|-
|}

MTV Awards

MTV Video Music Awards
The MTV Video Music Awards were established in 1984 by MTV to celebrate the top music videos of the year. Brown has won three awards from nineteen nominations.

|-
|rowspan="3"|2006
|rowspan="2"|"Run It"  (with Juelz Santana)
|Best New Artist
|
|-
|Viewer's Choice
|
|-
|"Yo (Excuse Me Miss)"
|Best R&B Video
|
|-
|2007
|"Wall to Wall"
|Best Choreography in a Video
|
|-
|rowspan="6"|2008
|"With You"
|Best Male Video
|
|-
|"Kiss Kiss" (with T-Pain)
|Best Choreography
|
|-
|rowspan="3"|"Forever"
|Best Choreography
|
|-
|Video of the Year
|
|-
|Best Dancing in a Video
|
|-
|"No Air"  (with Jordin Sparks)
|Best Female Video
|
|-
|rowspan="2"|2011
|rowspan="2"|"Look at Me Now" (with Lil Wayne & Busta Rhymes)
|Best Hip-Hop Video
|
|-
|Best Collaboration
|
|-
|rowspan="2"|2012
|rowspan="2"|"Turn Up the Music"
|Best Male Video
|
|-
|Best Choreography
|
|-
|2013
|"Fine China"
|Best Choreography
|
|-
|2014
|"Loyal" (with Lil Wayne & Tyga)
|Best Collaboration
|
|-
|2016
|Royalty
|Breakthrough Long Form Video
|
|-
|rowspan="2"|2021
|"Go Crazy"  (with Young Thug) 
|rowspan="2"|Best R&B
|
|-
|"Come Through"  (with H.E.R.) 
|
|}

MTV Australia Awards
The MTV Australia Awards were established in 2005 and is Australia's first awards show to celebrate both local and international acts. Brown has won one award from six nominations.

|-
|rowspan="4"|2006
|Chris Brown
|Best New Artist
|
|-
|"Yo (Excuse Me Miss)"
|rowspan="2"|Best R&B Video
|
|-
|rowspan="2"|"Run It!"  (with Juelz Santana)
|
|-
|Viewer's Choice
|
|-
|rowspan="2"|2009
|"No Air" (with Jordin Sparks)
|Best Collaboration
|
|-
|"Forever"
|Best Moves
|
|-
|}

MTV Europe Music Awards
The MTV Europe Music Awards were established in 1994 by MTV Europe to celebrate the most popular music videos in Europe. Brown has been nominated six times.

|-
|2006
|rowspan="3"|Chris Brown
|Artist's Choice
|
|-
|rowspan="2"|2008
|Best Male Act
|
|-
|Ultimate Urban
|
|-
|rowspan="2"|2012
|"International Love" (with Pitbull)
|Best Song
|
|-
|Chris Brown
|Worldwide Act: North America
|
|-
|2018
|"Freaky Friday" (with Lil Dicky)
|Best Video
|
|-
|}

MTV Video Music Awards Japan
The MTV Video Music Awards Japan were established in 2002 to celebrate the most popular music videos from Japanese and international artists. Brown has been nominated five times.

|-
|rowspan="2"|2008
|rowspan="2"|"Kiss Kiss"  (with T-Pain)
|Best Male Video
|
|-
|Best R&B Video
|
|-
|2010
|"Crawl"
|Best R&B Video
|
|-
|2012
|"Yeah 3x"
|Best Choreography
|
|-
|2013
|"Turn Up the Music
|Best Choreography
|
|}

MTV Movie Awards
The MTV Movie Awards were established in 1992 and is a film awards show presented annually on MTV. Brown has been nominated once.

|-
|2008
|This Christmas
|Best Breakthrough Performance
|
|}

TRL Awards
The TRL Awards were established in 2006 by MTV Italy to celebrate the most popular artists and music videos in Italy. Brown has won one award.

|-
|2006
|Chris Brown
|Fake ID Award
|
|}

MuchMusic Video Awards
The MuchMusic Video Awards are annual awards presented by the Canadian music video channel MuchMusic to honor the year's best music videos. Chris has been nominated four times.

|-
|2008
|"Kiss Kiss"  (with T-Pain)
|Best International Video - Artist
|
|-
|rowspan="3"|2012
|"Look at Me Now"  (with Busta Rhymes & Lil Wayne)
|Video of the Year
|
|-
|"Next 2 You"  (with Justin Bieber)
|International Artist Video of the Year
|
|-
|"International Love"  (with Pitbull)
|Most Streamed Video of the Year
|
|-
|}

NAACP Image Awards
The NAACP Image Awards is an award presented annually by the American National Association for the Advancement of Colored People (NAACP) to honor outstanding people of color in film, television, music and literature. Brown has won four awards from sixteen nominations.

|-
|2006
|rowspan="3"|Chris Brown
|Outstanding New Artist
|
|-
|2007
|Outstanding Male Artist
|
|-
|rowspan="2"|2008
|Outstanding Male Artist
|
|-
|Exclusive
|Outstanding Album
|
|-
|rowspan="2"|2009
|Chris Brown
|Outstanding Male Artist
|
|-
|"No Air"  (with Jordin Sparks)
| Outstanding Duo or Group
|
|-
|rowspan="2"|2012
|Chris Brown
|Outstanding Male Artist
|
|-
|F.A.M.E.
|Outstanding Album
|
|-
|rowspan="2"|2020
|rowspan="2"|"No Guidance" (with Drake)
|Outstanding Duo, Group or Collaboration
|
|-
|Outstanding Music Video/Visual Album
|
|-
|rowspan="2"|2022
|"Go Crazy (Remix)"  (with Young Thug, Future, Lil Durk & Mulatto) 
|rowspan="2"|Outstanding Duo, Group or Collaboration (Contemporary)
|
|-
|"Come Through"  (with H.E.R.) 
|
|-
|rowspan="4"|2023
|Chris Brown
|Outstanding Male Artist
|
|-
|Breezy
|Outstanding Album
|
|-
|"Diana"  (with Fireboy DML & Shenseea) 
|Outstanding International Song
|
|-
|"Call Me Every Day"  (with Wizkid)
|Outstanding Duo, Group or Collaboration (Contemporary) 
|
|}

Nickelodeon Kids' Choice Awards
The Nickelodeon Kids' Choice Awards were established in 1988 and is an annual awards show that honors the year's biggest television, film and music acts, as voted by the people who watch the Nickelodeon cable channel. Brown has won one award from two nominations. Chris was nominated in 2009, but his nomination was withdrawn following his domestic violence case.

|-
|2007
|rowspan="3"|Chris Brown
|Favorite Male Singer
|
|-
|2008
|Favorite Male Singer
|
|}

Nickelodeon Australian Kids' Choice Awards

|-
|2006
|Chris Brown
|Fave International Artist
|
|-
|rowspan="2"|2008
|"No Air"  (with Jordin Sparks) 
|Fave Song
|
|-
|Chris Brown
|Fave International Artist
|
|}

Nickelodeon UK Kids' Choice Awards
The Nickelodeon UK Kids' Choice Awards is an annual awards show, similar to the American and Australian versions. Brown has won one award.

|-
|2008
|Chris Brown
|Favorite Singer
|
|}

NRJ Music Awards

|-
|2009
|Chris Brown
|International Male Artist of the Year
|
|}

Ozone Awards
The Ozone Awards is an awards show focused on Southern musicians. Brown has won one award of two nominations.

|-
|rowspan="2"|2008
|Chris Brown
|Best R&B Artist
|
|-
|"Get Like Me"  (with David Banner & Yung Joc)
|Ozone Awards for Best Rap/R&B Collaboration
|
|}

People's Choice Awards
The People's Choice Awards is an annual award show from pop culture on Movie, television, and Music. Brown received two awards from nine nominations.

|-
|rowspan="5"|2009
|rowspan="2"|Chris Brown
|Favorite Male Artist
|
|-
|Favorite Star Under 25
|
|-
|rowspan="2"|"No Air" (with Jordin Sparks)
|Favorite Combined Forces
|
|-
|Favorite Pop Song
|
|-
|"With You"
|Favorite R&B Song
|
|-
|2012
|rowspan="4"|Chris Brown
|Favorite R&B Artist
|
|-
|2013
|Favorite Male Artist
|
|-
|2015
|rowspan ="2"|Favorite R&B Artist
|
|-
|2016
|
|}

Premios Juventud
The Premios Juventud are awarded annually by the television network Univision in the United States. Brown has received three nominations.

|-
|rowspan="2" scope="row"| 2012
|rowspan="2" scope="row"|"International Love" (with Pitbull)
|scope="row"|La Combinación Perfecta (The Perfect Combination)
|
|-
|scope="row"|Mi Ringtone (My Ringtone)
|
|-
|2013
|"Algo Me Gusta de Ti" (with Wisin & Yandel and T-Pain)
|scope="row"|La Combinación Perfecta (The Perfect Combination)
|
|-
|}

Premios Tu Mundo
The Premios Tu Mundo are presented annually by the television network Telemundo in the United States. Brown received two nominations.

|-
|rowspan="2"|2013
|rowspan="2"| "Algo Me Gusta de Ti"  (with Wisin & Yandel and T-Pain)
|Most Popular Song of the Year
|
|-
|Best Music Video
|
|}

Radio Disney Music Awards
First held in 2002, the Radio Disney Music Awards is an annual awards show which is operated and governed by Radio Disney. Brown received two nominations.

|-
|rowspan="2"|2006
|rowspan="2"|Chris Brown
|Best Male Artist
|
|-
|Best Dance Style
|
|-
|}

Soul Train Music Awards
The Soul Train Music Awards is an annual awards show aired in national broadcast syndication that honors the best in African American music and entertainment established in 1987. Brown has won 14 awards from 56 nominations.

|-
|2006
|Chris Brown
|Best R&B/Soul New Artist
|
|-
|rowspan="2"|2007
|"Yo (Excuse Me Miss)"
|Best R&B/Soul Single
|
|-
|Chris Brown
|Best R&B/Soul Album
|
|-
|rowspan="5"|2011
|Chris Brown
|Best R&B/Soul Male Artist
|
|-
|F.A.M.E.
|Album of the Year
|
|-
|"Look at Me Now"  (with Busta Rhymes & Lil Wayne)
|Best Hip-Hop Song of the Year
|
|-
|rowspan="2"|"She Ain't You"
|Song of the Year
|
|-
|Best Dance Performance
|
|-
|2012
|"Turn Up the Music"
|Best Dance Performance
|
|-
|rowspan="5"|2013
|Chris Brown
|Best R&B/Soul Male Artist
|
|-
|rowspan="3"|"Fine China"
|Song of the Year
|
|-
|Video of the Year
|
|-
|Best Dance Performance
|
|-
|"Put It Down"  (with Brandy) 
|Best Collaboration
|
|-
|rowspan="7"|2014
|rowspan="4"|"Loyal"  (with Lil Wayne & Tyga)
|Best Hip-Hop Song of the Year
|
|-
|Song of the Year
|
|-
|Best Dance Performance
|
|-
|Best Collaboration
|
|-
|rowspan="2"|"New Flame"  (with Usher & Rick Ross)
|Best Collaboration
|
|-
|Video of the Year
|
|-
|Chris Brown
|Best R&B/Soul Male Artist
|
|-
|rowspan="4"|2015
|X
|Album of the Year
|
|-
|Chris Brown
|Best R&B/Soul Male Artist
|
|-
|"Ayo"  (with Tyga) 
|Best Dance Performance
|
|-
|"Post to Be"  (with Omarion & Jhené Aiko) 
|Best Collaboration
|
|-
|rowspan="3"|2017
|Chris Brown
|Best R&B/Soul Male Artist
|
|-
|rowspan="2"|"Party"  (with Usher & Gucci Mane) 
|Video of the Year
|
|-
|Best Dance Performance
|
|-
|rowspan="2"|2018
|Heartbreak on a Full Moon
|Album/Mixtape of the Year
|
|-
|"Tempo"
|Best Dance Performance
|
|-
|rowspan="8"|2019
|Indigo
|Album/Mixtape of the Year
|
|-
|rowspan="5"|"No Guidance"  (with Drake) 
|Best Collaboration
|
|-
|Best Dance Performance
|
|-
|Song of the Year
|
|-
|The Ashford & Simpson Songwriter's Award
|
|-
|Video of the Year
|
|-
|"Easy (Remix)"  (with DaniLeigh) 
|Best Dance Performance
|
|-
|Chris Brown
|Best R&B/Soul Male Artist
|
|-
|rowspan="7"|2020
|rowspan="5"|"Go Crazy"  (with Young Thug) 
|Song of the Year
|
|-
|Video of the Year
|
|-
|Best Collaboration
|
|-
|Best Dance Performance
|
|-
|The Ashford & Simpson Songwriter's Award
|
|-
|Slime & B  (with Young Thug) 
|Album of the Year
|
|-
|Chris Brown
|Best R&B/Soul Male Artist
|
|-
|rowspan="6"|2021
|"City Girls"  (with Young Thug) 
|Best Dance Performance
|
|-
|rowspan="2"|"Go Crazy (Remix)"  (with Young Thug, Future, Lil Durk & Mulatto) 
|Video of the Year
|
|-
|rowspan="2"|Best Collaboration
|
|-
|rowspan="2"|"Come Through"  (with H.E.R.) 
|
|-
|The Ashford & Simpson Songwriter's Award
|
|-
|Chris Brown
|Best R&B/Soul Male Artist
|
|-
|rowspan="5"|2022
|Breezy
|Album of the Year
|
|-
|rowspan="2"|"Call Me Every Day"  (with Wizkid) 
|Best Collaboration
|
|-
|rowspan="2"|Best Dance Performance
|
|-
|"WE (Warm Embrace)"
|
|-
|Chris Brown
|Best R&B/Soul Male Artist
|
|-
|}

Spotify Awards

|-
|2020
|"No Guidance" (with Drake)
|Spotify Awards
|
|-
|}

Teen Choice Awards
The Teen Choice Awards were established in 1999 to honor the year's biggest achievements in music, movies, sports and television, as voted for by young people aged between 13 and 19. Brown has won seven awards from twenty three nominations.

|-
|rowspan="4"|2006
|rowspan="4"|Chris Brown
|Choice Male Hottie
|
|-
|Choice Music: Male Artist
|
|-
|Choice Music: R&B Artist
|
|-
|Choice Music: Male Breakout Artist
|
|-
|rowspan="3"|2007
|Stomp the Yard
|Choice Movie: Breakout Male
|
|-
|Chris Brown
|Choice Music: R&B Artist
|
|-
|"Wall to Wall"
|Choice Music: R&B Track
|
|-
|rowspan="15"|2008
|"With You"
|Choice Music: Single
|
|-
|"No Air"  (with Jordin Sparks)
|rowspan="2"|Choice Music: Hook Up
|
|-
|"Shawty Get Loose"  (with Lil Mama & T-Pain)
|
|-
|rowspan="2"|Chris Brown
|Choice Music: Male Artist
|
|-
|Choice Music: R&B Artist
|
|-
|"No Air"  (with Jordin Sparks)
|Choice Music: Love Song
|
|-
|rowspan="2"|"Forever"
|Choice Music: R&B Track
|
|-
|Choice Music: Summer Song
|
|-
|"Shawty Get Loose"  (with Lil Mama & T-Pain)
|Choice Music: Rap/Hip Hop Track
|
|-
|rowspan="6"|Chris Brown
|Choice Male Hottie
|
|-
|Choice Red Carpet Fashion Icon Male
|
|-
|Post Show: Best Acceptable Speech
|
|-
|Post Show: Spontaneously Crazy Moment
|
|-
|Post Show: Best Dressed Male
|
|-
|Post Show: Celebrity Cameo
|
|-
|2016
|"Something New"  (with Zendaya)
|Choice Music: R&B/Hip-Hop Song
|
|-
|}

Urban Music Awards
The Urban Music Awards is an annual awards show that recognizes the achievements of hip-hop, R&B and soul artists. Chris Brown has won eight.

|-
|rowspan="2"|2011
|"Champion" (with Chipmunk)
|Best Collaboration
|
|-
|rowspan="2"|Chris Brown
|rowspan="2"|International Artist of the Year
| 
|-
|2012
|
|-
|rowspan="3"|2015
|rowspan="2"|"Body On Me" (with Rita Ora)
|Best Video
|
|-
|Best Collaboration
|
|-
|Chris Brown
|Best International Artist
|
|-
|rowspan="2"|2017
|rowspan="2"|Chris Brown
|Artist of the Year (USA)
|
|-
|Best International Act
|
|-
|rowspan="2"|2018
|rowspan="2"|Chris Brown
|Best International Artist
|
|-
|Artist of the Year (USA)
|
|-
|2020
|rowspan=|Chris Brown
|Artist of the Year (USA)
|
|-
|rowspan="5"|2023
|rowspan="2"|Chris Brown
|Artist of the Year (USA)
|
|-
|Most Inspiring Act
|
|-
|"Call Me Every Day"  (with Wizkid)
|Best Collaboration
|
|-
|"Monalisa (Remix)"  (with Lojay & Sarz)
|Best Single
|
|-
|Breezy
|Best Album
|
|}

Vevo Certified Award
Vevo Certified Award honors artists with over 100 million views on Vevo and its partners (including YouTube) through special features on the Vevo website. It was launched in June 2012.

WatsUp TV Africa Music Video Awards
WatsUp TV Africa Music Video Awards is an award presented by the TV channel WatsUp TV to honor the best in the African music videos scene. Chris Brown has received one nomination.

|-
|2016
|"Little More (Royalty)"
|Best International Video
|
|}

World Music Awards
The World Music Awards were established in 1989 and is an international awards show that annually honors musicians based on their worldwide sales figures, which are provided by the International Federation of the Phonographic Industry. Brown has won one award from seventeen nominations.

|-
|2006
|Chris Brown
|World's Best R&B Artist
|
|-
|2008
|Chris Brown
|World's Best Male R&B Artist
|
|-
|rowspan="15"|2014
|rowspan="3"|Chris Brown
|World's Best Male Artist
|
|-
|World's Best Live Act
|
|-
|World's Best Entertainer of the Year
|
|-
|"Don't Wake Me Up"
|rowspan="6"|World's Best Song
|
|-
|"Don't Think They Know"  (with Aaliyah)
|
|-
|"Fine China"
|
|-
|"It Won't Stop"  (with Sevyn Streeter)
|
|-
|"Love More"  (with Nicki Minaj)
|
|-
|"Show Me"  (with Kid Ink)
|
|-
|Fortune
|World's Best Album
|
|-
|"Don't Wake Me Up"
|rowspan="5"|World's Best Video
|
|-
|"Don't Think They Know"  (with Aaliyah)
|
|-
|"Fine China"
|
|-
|"It Won't Stop"  (with Sevyn Streeter)
|
|-
|"Love More"  (with Nicki Minaj)
|
|}

The Headies

The Headies (originally called the Hip Hop World Awards) is a music awards show established in 2006 by the Hip Hop World Magazine of Nigeria to recognize outstanding achievements in the Nigerian music industry. Brown won international artiste of the year in 2022, beating Bieber, Beyoncé, Drake, Ed Sheeran and Nas. The category is designed for non-African artists or groups with outstanding achievements and impact on Afrobeats.

|-
|2022
|Chris Brown
|International Artist of the Year
|
|}

Youth Rock Awards
The Youth Rock Awards is an award event held in 2011, honoring stars in Music and Movie. Brown received one nomination.

|-
|2011
|"Next 2 You"  (with Justin Bieber)
|Rockin' Music Video of the Year
|
|}

References

Brown, Chris